Haruhisa Chiba (3 June 1951 – 8 February 2006) was a Japanese alpine skier. He competed at the 1972 Winter Olympics and the 1976 Winter Olympics.

References

1951 births
2006 deaths
Japanese male alpine skiers
Olympic alpine skiers of Japan
Alpine skiers at the 1972 Winter Olympics
Alpine skiers at the 1976 Winter Olympics
Sportspeople from Hokkaido
20th-century Japanese people